Stenalia ermolenkoi is a beetle in the genus Stenalia of the family Mordellidae. It is found only in Azerbaijan. It was described in 2000 by Odnosum.

References

ermolenkoi
Beetles described in 2000
Endemic fauna of Azerbaijan